"Sweet Dreams" is the fourth single by Vamps, released on September 30, 2009. This single version is slightly different from the album's. The limited edition came with a DVD of the music videos for both songs. The single reached number 2 on the Oricon chart.

Track listing

References 

2009 singles
Japanese rock songs
Songs written by Hyde (musician)
2009 songs